James Campbell High School, often simply Campbell High School or JCHS, is a public coeducational high school located at 91-980 North Road in Ewa Beach, Hawaii, United States. The school serves grades nine through twelve, has an enrollment just over 3000 students, and is part of the Leeward Subdistrict of the Hawaii State Department of Education. It also serves children of Department of Defense employees who live in military housing in Ewa Beach, Ewa and Iroquois Point. Over half of the students are of Philippine descent.

The school's educational program, Smaller Learning Communities, aims to help students in a chosen career pathway, thus benefiting them in precise occupational skills for the future.  , James Campbell High School became the second Hawaii high school (along with the private Mid-Pacific Institute) to gain the status of International Baccalaureate World School, expecting to award prospective JCHS graduates beginning at Commencement 2010. The school has a variety of programs such as agriculture, marine science, newspaper, yearbook, and television production media.

James Campbell High School serves seven rural and two military communities in that area. The school includes 15 major buildings and an athletic complex on 38 acres. There is also a library that doubles as the community’s library as well. It offers comprehensive programs in vocational, technical, academic, and special education. James Campbell High School was accredited in 2011 by the Western Association of Schools & Colleges for a period of six years with a mid-term review.

Notable alumni
Bretman Rock, social media influencer
Jocelyn Alo, softball player

Notes

External links

Hawaii Department of Education website
James Campbell High School IB League information
Additional school information
James Campbell High School Band website
"Campbell boasts Math Bowl champs" – The Honolulu Advertiser article

1962 establishments in Hawaii
Educational institutions established in 1962
International Baccalaureate schools in Hawaii
Public high schools in Honolulu County, Hawaii